Moguta (Mogoytı) is a rural locality (a selo) in Shebalinsky District, the Altai Republic, Russia. The population was 31 as of 2016. There is 1 street.

Geography 
Moguta is located 51 km northwest of Shebalino (the district's administrative centre) by road. Uluscherga is the nearest rural locality.

References 

Rural localities in Shebalinsky District